Ranunculus montanus, called the mountain buttercup along with other members of its genus, is a species of flowering plant in the family Ranunculaceae, native to the mountains of central and south-central Europe, with perhaps some populations in the Republic of Karelia in Russia. Its cultivar 'Molten Gold' has gained the Royal Horticultural Society's Award of Garden Merit.

References

montanus
Flora of Albania
Flora of Austria
Flora of France
Flora of Germany
Flora of Italy
Flora of North European Russia
Flora of Switzerland
Flora of Yugoslavia
Plants described in 1799